Nick Gaetano is an artist, known for creating the 25th Anniversary Edition cover art for the works of Ayn Rand: Atlas Shrugged, The Fountainhead, Anthem, We the Living, Philosophy: Who Needs It, Capitalism: the Unknown Ideal, For the New Intellectual, The Early Ayn Rand, The Romantic Manifesto, and The Virtue of Selfishness. He also created The Ayn Rand Postage Stamp. In 2002, the original art for the Anniversary Editions of The Fountainhead and Atlas Shrugged sold at auction for $118,000 (According to Gaetano he never got a penny for it).

Biography
Nick Gaetano was born in Colorado Springs, Colorado. He attended the Art Center College of Design where he received his education. He currently resides in Laguna Beach, California.

Awards
Nick Gaetano received the following awards:
Fellowship/ New Jersey State Council of the Arts
Juror's Award/ American Annual Works on Paper/ Jane Livingston
Juror's Award/ Expo 2003/ Dallas TX/ Vincent Falsetta 
Juror's Award  / TVAA / Dallas TX - Nancy Whitenack
Juror's Award / Best of Show /Rockwell Artists League / Ted Pillsbury

References

https://www.interviewmagazine.com/culture/nick-gaetano

External links
 Nick Gaetano's website
 Nick Gaetano's Facebook page

American illustrators
American people of Italian descent
Living people
People from Burlingame, California
Year of birth missing (living people)
Place of birth missing (living people)